Izad Kheyl (also Romanized as Īzadi Kheyl; also known as Īzadī Kheyl) is a village in Larim Rural District, Gil Khuran District, Juybar County, Mazandaran Province, Iran. At the 2006 census, its population was 564, in 158 families.

References 

Populated places in Juybar County